The Greensboro massacre was a deadly confrontation which occurred on November 3, 1979, in Greensboro, North Carolina, US, when members of the Ku Klux Klan and the American Nazi Party (ANP) shot and killed five participants in a "Death to the Klan" march which was organized by the Communist Workers Party (CWP).

The event had been preceded by inflammatory rhetoric. The Greensboro city police department had an informant within the KKK and ANP group who notified them that the Klan was prepared for armed violence. As the two opposing groups came in contact with each other at the onset of the march, both sides exchanged gunfire. The CWP and its supporters had handguns, while members of the KKK and the ANP had a variety of firearms. The people who were killed included four members of the CWP, who had originally come to Greensboro to support workers' rights activism among mostly black textile industry workers in the area. In addition to the five deaths, nine demonstrators, two news crew members, and a Klansman were wounded.

Two criminal trials of several of the Klan and ANP members were conducted by state and federal prosecutors. In the first trial, conducted by the state, five were charged with first-degree murder and felony riot. All of the defendants were acquitted. In 1980, the surviving protesters, led by the Christic Institute, filed a separate civil suit against 87 defendants. The suit alleged civil rights violations, failure to protect demonstrators, and wrongful death. Eight defendants were found liable for the wrongful death of the one protester who was not a member of the CWP. A third, federal criminal civil rights trial in 1984, was held against nine defendants. Again, all of the defendants were acquitted by a jury that accepted their claims of self-defense, despite the fact that the contemporary New York Times opinion page described newsreel film footage of the massacre as "vivid newsreel film to the contrary". News outlets, including the New York Times, the Washington Post, and the News & Record in Greensboro, North Carolina have remarked on the all-white juries which tried the 1979 and 1984 cases.
 
In 2004, 25 years after the event, a private organization formed the Greensboro Truth and Reconciliation Commission with the intention to investigate the events of 1979. Though the private organization was limited in its investigation because it failed to secure authority or local sanction, its Final Report concluded that both sides had engaged in inflammatory rhetoric, but that the Klan and ANP members had intended to inflict injury on protesters, and the police department had colluded with the Klan by allowing anticipated violence to take place. In 2009, the Greensboro City Council passed a resolution expressing regret for the deaths in the march. In 2015, the city unveiled a marker to memorialize the Greensboro Massacre. On August 15, 2017 and on October 6, 2020, the Greensboro City Council formally apologized for the massacre.

Background
The Communist Workers' Party (CWP) had its origin in 1973 in New York as a splinter group of the Communist Party USA. "The CWP was one of several groups which were established as part of a Maoist revival within the radical community. To the Maoists, the pro-Soviet Communist Party USA was soft on capitalism and it also lacked militancy." Its leaders intended to increase activism in what they called the Workers Viewpoint Organization (WVO), along the Maoist model. In 1979, members of the CWP came to North Carolina in an attempt to organize textile workers. In the South, the communists had achieved little success with white workers, so they shifted much of their attention to black textile workers, who had long been excluded from these jobs in previous decades. As a result of these efforts, the CWP came into conflict with a local Ku Klux Klan chapter and the American Nazi Party. Some CWP members also worked in the textile mills, including James Waller, who left his medical practice to do so. He became president of the local textile workers union. WVO members were active in Durham and Greensboro.

The WVO resisted the continuation of racial discrimination in North Carolina by confronting a local KKK chapter. Hostility between the groups flared up in July 1979, when protesters in China Grove, North Carolina, disrupted a screening of The Birth of a Nation, a 1915 silent film by D. W. Griffith which portrayed the era of Reconstruction and the formation of the KKK in heroic terms, and portrayed blacks in a demeaning, racist way. Taunts and inflammatory rhetoric were exchanged between members of the groups during the ensuing months.

In October 1979, the WVO renamed itself the Communist Workers Organization. It planned to stage a rally and a march against the Klan on November 3, 1979, in Greensboro. The county seat of Guilford County, this city had been a site of major civil rights actions in the 1960s. Sit-ins resulted in the desegregation of lunch counters. The CWP entitled their protest as the "Death to the Klan March"; the event was scheduled to start in a predominantly black housing project called Morningside Homes on the black side of town, and to proceed to the Greensboro City Hall. The CWP distributed flyers that called for radical, even violent opposition to the Klan. One flier said that the Klan "should be physically beaten and chased out of town. This is the only language they understand. Armed self-defense is the only defense." Communist organizers publicly challenged the Klan to attend the march.

Rally
Four local TV news camera teams arrived at Morningside Homes at the corner of Carver and Everitt streets to cover the protest march. Members of the CWP and other anti-Klan supporters gathered to rally the march, which was planned to proceed through the city to the Greensboro City Hall.

As the marchers collected, a caravan of nine cars and a van filled with an estimated 40 KKK and American Nazi Party members drove back and forth in front of the housing project at around 11:20 AM. The two groups heckled each other, and some marchers beat the cars with picket sticks and kicks. The first shot came from the head of the KKK caravan, although it wasn't clear who fired the shot. Several witnesses reported that Klansman Mark Sherer fired first, into the air. A "thick blue smoke" was spotted after the first shot, consistent with the discharge from a black powder pistol Sherer owned. A second shot was fired into the air by Klansman Brent Fletcher, and shots three and four by Sherer, into the ground and a parked car. Some KKK and ANP members exited their vehicles and engaged in a physical confrontation with marchers. CWP member James Waller equipped himself with a shotgun from fellow marcher Tom Clark's truck during the confrontation. Klansman Roy Toney spotted him and struggled with Waller for control of the shotgun, which went off during the struggle. 

The first shots wounding and killing individuals were discharged soon after, primarily by caravan members. Several caravan members equipped themselves with long guns from the trunk of a Ford Fairlane and fired at the marchers, while the rest of the cars and their occupants fled. Marchers Bill Sampson, Allen Blitz, Rand Manzella, and Claire Butler fired back at the caravan members with handguns. Two of the first fatalities were Waller, shot by ANP member Roland Wood and Klansman David Matthews, and CWP member Cesar Cauche, shot by Klansman Jerry Paul Smith. Both were unarmed at the time of their deaths. Unarmed marcher Michael Nathan was shot and mortally wounded by Matthews while running towards Waller's body. Sampson was killed while firing at the caravan members and CWP member Sandra Smith was killed while taking cover near Butler, who was also firing at caravan members. Smith herself was unarmed. The final shot was fired by Blitz 88 seconds after the violence first began.

Four CWP members were killed at the scene and Nathan died of his wounds at the hospital two days later. Twelve others were wounded. The filmed coverage of the shootings was carried on national and international news, and the event became known as the "Greensboro Massacre." Smith was black, Cauce was Hispanic, and the other three men killed were white. Both blacks and whites were among the wounded, including one KKK member and two news crew members.

Casualties
Died: All but Michael Nathan were CWP members and rank-and-file union leaders and organizers. Nathan was sworn into the CWP on his deathbed.
Cesar Cauce, whose family immigrated as refugees from Cuba when he was a child, grew up in Miami, Florida and graduated magna cum laude from Duke University; he worked in the anti-war movement, and as a union organizer at textile mills in North Carolina. He was the brother of Ana Mari Cauce, president of the University of Washington since 2015;
James Waller, elected as president of a local textile workers union; originally taught at Duke University and was a co-founder of the Carolina Brown Lung Association (for textile workers); he had left his medical practice in North Carolina to organize textile workers; 
William Evan Sampson, a graduate of the Harvard Divinity School and medical student who became active in civil rights; he worked to organize the union at one of Cone Mills' Greensboro textile plants;
Sandra Neely Smith, a civil rights activist and president of the student body at Greensboro's Bennett College; became a nurse and worked to organize textile workers and improve health conditions at the plant; and 
Michael Nathan, chief of pediatrics at Lincoln Community Health Center, a clinic for children from low-income families in Durham, North Carolina. Wounded in the shooting, he died two days later at the hospital. He was not a member of the CWP but was supporting his wife, Marty Nathan, who was.

Wounded survivors: 
Paul Bermanzohn, CWP organizer and physician, required brain surgery, suffered paralyzed left hand;
Thomas Clark, marcher;
Martha "Marty" Nathan, CWP member and physician, widow of Michael Nathan;
Nelson Johnson, organizer and CWP member;
James Wrenn, CWP member, critically wounded, required brain surgery; 
Frankie Powell, CWP member, struck by birdshot in legs; 
Claire Butler, CWP member;
Don Pelles, marcher, struck by birdshot in face;
Rand Manzella, marcher;
Harold Flowers, KKK member, shot in the arm and left leg;
Matt Sinclair, WTVD reporter, struck by birdshot; and 
David Dalton, news cameraman;

Role of the police
By the late 1970s, most police departments had become familiar with handling demonstrations, especially in cities such as Greensboro where numerous civil rights events had taken place since 1960. CWP march organizers had filed their plans for this march with the police and gained permission to hold it. Police generally covered such formal events in order to prevent outbreaks of violence; few officers were present during this march. A police photographer and a detective followed the Klan and neo-Nazi caravan to the site, but they did not attempt to directly intervene in events.

Edward Dawson, a Klansman-turned FBI/police informant was riding in the lead car of the caravan. He had been an FBI informant since 1969 as part of the agency's COINTELPRO program. He was among the founders of the North Carolina Knights of the Ku Klux Klan when the North Carolina chapter of the United Klans of America split. By 1979 he was working as an informant for the Greensboro Police Department. He was given a copy of the march route by the police and informed them of the potential for violence.  

The police detective who trailed the caravan radioed for extra units at 11:23 AM. The first to arrive were two tactical officers two minutes later, who arrested twelve caravan members from the van. However, the cars and their occupants were able to escape from the scene. Some marchers were also arrested later on as other police units converged on the scene. 

Bernard Butkovich, an undercover agent for the US Bureau of Alcohol, Tobacco and Firearms (ATF), had infiltrated a unit of the American Nazi Party (ANP) during this period. This group had been formed by Frank Collin, who had been ousted from the National Socialist White People's Party. The ANP members joined with the KKK chapter to disrupt the November 1979 protest march. At the 1980 criminal trial, the neo-Nazis claimed that Butkovich encouraged them to carry firearms to the demonstration. At the 1985 civil trial, Butkovich testified that he was aware that the KKK and ANP members intended to confront the demonstrators, but he did not tell the police or any other law enforcement agency.

Aftermath

Funeral
A funeral for the five victims was held on November 11, 1979, followed by a procession in which 200–400 people marched through the city to Maplewood Cemetery. There was controversy over whether or not the funeral should be held, but the city had arranged for full coverage by the police force and hundreds of armed National Guard troops to protect marchers.<ref>"Greensboro Massacre", Civil Rights Greensboro, website and database, Library, University of North Carolina Greensboro</ref>

Gravestone
The four white men were buried in the traditionally all-black cemetery near Morningside. The inscription intended for their memorial was initially opposed by the city council, citing new ordinances banning political speech in that context. With support from the North Carolina ACLU, the CWP proceeded to commemorate these four with the following inscription:

The body of Sandi Smith, who was African American, was returned at her family's request to her hometown in South Carolina for burial.

State's prosecution
Forty Klansmen and neo-Nazis, and several CWP marchers were said to have taken part in the shootings. The police arrested 16 Klansmen and Nazis, and several CWP members. The FBI started an investigation which it called GREENKIL (Greensboro Killings), turning over evidence it gathered to the state of North Carolina for its murder trial.

The state attorney prosecuted the six strongest criminal cases first, charging five Klansmen with murder: David Wayne Matthews, Jerry Paul Smith, Jack Wilson Fowler, Harold Dean Flowers, and Billy Joe Franklin. One was charged with a lesser crime. In November 1980 the jury acquitted all the defendants, finding that they had acted in self-defense.  Residents of Morningside Homes — the housing development where the violence occurred, and students at North Carolina Agricultural and Technical State University (A&T), expressed shock and anger over the verdict and a feeling of hopelessness regarding the judicial system and the Ku Klux Klan.

Federal criminal trial
The Department of Justice through the FBI had an extensive criminal investigation underway. After the acquittals in 1980, the FBI re-opened its investigation in preparation for a federal prosecution. Based on additional evidence, a federal grand jury indicted nine men on civil rights charges in 1983.

The case brought by the US attorney "charged the Klansmen and Nazis with racially motivated violence and with interference in a racially integrated event.". Three men were charged with violating the civil rights of the five victims: the defendants were David Wayne Matthews, Jerry Paul Smith and Jack Wilson Fowler, who had been prosecuted and acquitted in the state criminal trial.

Six other men were charged with "conspiracy to violate the demonstrators' civil rights::" Virgil Lee Griffin, Sr.; Eddie Dawson (also a police informant), Roland Wayne Wood, Roy Clinton Toney, Coleman Blair Pridmore, and Rayford Milano Caudle

On April 15, 1984, all nine defendants were acquitted. The government had a burden to prove the defendants where motivated by racial hatred in order to bring them to federal charges. The CWP believed that the indictment was drawn too narrowly, giving the defense an opportunity to argue that political opposition to Communism and patriotic fervor, rather than racial motivations, prompted the confrontation. Neither trial "investigated the actions of Federal agents or the Greensboro police."

Waller v. Butkovich
In 1980, survivors filed a civil suit in Federal District Court seeking $48 million in damages. The Christic Institute led the legal effort. The complaint alleged that law-enforcement officials knew "that Klansmen and Nazis would use violence to disrupt the demonstration by Communist labor organizers and black residents of Greensboro but deliberately failed to protect them." Four federal agents were named as defendants in the suit, in addition to 36 Greensboro police and municipal officials, and 20 Klansmen and members of the American Nazi Party. Among the federal defendants was Bernard Butkovich of the Bureau of Alcohol, Tobacco and Firearms, who had worked as an undercover agent in 1979 and infiltrated one of the American Nazi Party chapters about three months before the protest. He testified that a Klansman had referred in a planning meeting to using pipe bombs for possible assaults at the rally, and that he took no further action.

The Christic legal team was led by attorneys Lewis Pitts and Daniel Sheehan, together with People's Law Office attorney G. Flint Taylor and attorney Carolyn McAllaster of Durham, North Carolina. A Federal jury in Winston-Salem, North Carolina, found two Klansmen, three Nazis, two Greensboro police officers, and a police informant liable for the wrongful death of Dr. Michael Nathan, a non-CWP demonstrator, and for injuries to survivors Paul Bermanzohn and Tom Clark, who had been wounded. It awarded two survivors with a $350,000 judgment against the city, the Ku Klux Klan, and the American Nazi Party for violating the civil rights of the demonstrators. The widow Dr. Martha "Marty" Nathan, was paid by the City in order to cover damages caused by the KKK and ANP as well. She chose to donate some money to grassroots efforts for social justice and education.

25th anniversary events
The CWP gradually dissolved, and its members went on to other pursuits. In November 2004, nearly 700 people, including several survivors, marched in Greensboro along the original planned route from the housing project to Greensboro City Hall to mark the 25th anniversary of the event.

That year, a group of private citizens founded the Greensboro Truth and Reconciliation Commission. They appealed to the Mayor and the City Council for their endorsement, but failed to gain support. The Greensboro City Council, led by mayor Keith Holliday, voted 6 to 3 against endorsing the work of the group. The three African-American members of the Council voted in favor of the measure. The mayor at the time of the massacre, Jim Melvin, also rejected the private commission.

The private group announced that the Commission would take public testimony and conduct an investigation, in order to examine the causes and consequences of the massacre. It was patterned after official Truth and Reconciliation Commissions, generally organized by national governments, such as that notably conducted in post-apartheid South Africa. But, the Greensboro commission had no official recognition and authority. It lacked both the power of subpoena to compel testimony, and the ability to invoke the penalty of perjury for false testimony.

The Commission reported its findings and conclusions. It noted that both the Communist Workers Party and the Klan contributed in varying degrees to the violence, especially given the violent rhetoric which they had been espousing for months leading up to the confrontation at the march. It said that the CWP did not intend to use handguns for anything other than self-defense. It said that the protesters, most of whom did not live in Greensboro or the county, had not fully secured the community support of the Morningside Homes residents for holding the event there. Many of the residents did not approve of the protest because they feared it had the risk of catalyzing violence on their doorsteps. The Commission concluded that the KKK and ANP members went to the rally intending to provoke a violent confrontation, and that they fired on demonstrators with intent of injury.

In its Final Report, the Commission noted the importance of the Greensboro Police Department's absence from the scene. The presence of police at previous confrontations between the same groups had resulted in no violence.  There had been testimony at the Commission that the Greensboro Police Department had infiltrated the Klan and, through a paid informant, knew of the white supremacists' plans and the strong potential for violence that day.  The informant had formerly been on the Federal Bureau of Investigation's payroll and maintained contact with his agent's supervisor. Consequently, the FBI was also aware of the impending armed confrontation. The Commission reported that at least one activist in the crowd fired back after the attack started.

City's recognition
On June 17, 2009 the City Council issued a "statement of regret" about the 1979 incident.
On May 24, 2015, the City of Greensboro officially unveiled a historical marker acknowledging the 1979 events, at a ceremony attended by more than 300 people. It reads: "Greensboro Massacre – Ku Klux Klansmen and American Nazi Party members, on Nov. 3, 1979, shot and killed five Communist Workers Party members one-tenth mile north." The city council had voted to approve the proposed state highway marker. Two city council members voted against the historical marker, explaining that they did not consider the event a "massacre".
On October 6, 2020, the city council approved a resolution apologizing for the incident.

In popular culture
Orchestral Manoeuvres in the Dark recorded "88 Seconds in Greensboro" about the massacre.
Pop Will Eat Itself recorded “88 Seconds... & Still Counting” on the album Cure For Sanity also about the incident.
Saturday Night Live aired a sketch the following year titled "Commie Hunting Season" that made specific reference to the incident. 

References

Further reading
Articles
 
Bacigal, Ronald J., and Margaret Ivey Bacigal. "When Racists and Radicals Meet." Emory Law Journal 38 (Fall 1989).
 Bryant, Pat. "Justice Vs. the Movement." Radical America 14, no. 6 (1980).
Civil Rights Greensboro: The articles of Charles Babington , Library, University of North Carolina – Greensboro
 Eastland, Terry. "The Communists and the Klan," Commentary 69, no. 5 (1980).
 Institute for Southern Studies. "The Third of November," Southern Exposure 9, no. 3 (1981).
 
Parenti, Michael, and Carolyn Kazdin. "The Untold Story of the Greensboro Massacre." Monthly Review 33, no. 6 (1981).
Ray O. Light Group. "'Left' Opportunism and the Rise of Reaction: The Lessons of the Greensboro Massacre." Toward Victorious Afro-American National Liberation: A Collection of Pamphlets, Leaflets and Essays Which Dealt In a Timely Way With the Concrete Ongoing Struggle for Black Liberation Over the Past Decade and More pp. 249–260. Ray O. Light Publications: Bronx NY, 1982.
 Taylor, Flint. "Lessons on the Anniversary of the Greensboro Massacre," Truthout, Nov. 3, 2017.

Books
 Bermanzohn, Paul, The True Story of the Greensboro Massacre. Cesar Cauce Publishers, 1981.
 Bermanzohn, Sally Avery. Through Survivors' Eyes: From the Sixties to the Greensboro Massacre. 400 pages, 57 illustrations, index. Vanderbilt University Press; 1st edition (September 1, 2003). .
 Elbaum, Max. Revolution in the Air: Sixties Radicals turn to Lenin, Mao and Che, Verso Books, 2002.
 Waller, Signe. Love And Revolution: A Political Memoir: People's History Of The Greensboro Massacre, Its Setting And Aftermath. London & New York: Rowman & Littlefield. 2002. .
 Wheaton, Elizabeth. Codename GREENKIL: The 1979 Greensboro Killings. 328 pages. Athens: University of Georgia Press, 1987. .

Video
 News footage of the 1979 shootings, YouTube
 "The Greensboro Massacre" The History Channel. Lawbreakers Series. Video Cassette. 46 minutes. 2000. Broadcast October 13, 2004.
 Greensboro's Child . Directed by Andy Burton Coon. Independent. 2002.  of eyewitness interviews. 
Filmmaker Adam Zucker examines the work of the Greensboro Truth and Reconciliation Commission in his 2007 documentary Greensboro: Closer to the Truth .External links
 Greensboro Truth and Reconciliation Commission: Final Report (PDF). Examines the context, causes, sequence and consequences of Nov 3, 1979.

Articles and news reports
 "88 Seconds in Greensboro": Transcript, PBS Frontline''. (archive link) Reported by James Reston, Jr. Directed by William Cran. Original Airdate: January 24, 1983.

Anniversary news reports
 Scott Mason and Kamal Wallace, "Greensboro Set To Mark Deadly Anniversary: Five Killed, 11 Injured In 'Greensboro Massacre'", WRAL. (archive link) Posted: 11:25 am EST November 3, 2003.  
 "Remembering the 1979 Greensboro Massacre 25 years later". Broadcast by Democracy Now! on November 18, 2004. (archive link)

Websites
 Civil Rights Greensboro.  Library website and searchable database, University of North Carolina-Greensboro
 Greensboro VOICES.  Contains oral histories  pertaining to November 3, 1979.
 Greensboro Justice Fund. (archive link). Official website, organized to aid survivors in litigation and education about the massacre

1979 in North Carolina
1979 deaths
1979 riots
1979 mass shootings in the United States
Massacres in 1979
Anti-communism in the United States
Communism in the United States
Filmed killings
History of African-American civil rights
History of Greensboro, North Carolina
Deaths by firearm in North Carolina
Ku Klux Klan crimes
Massacres in the United States
Neo-fascist terrorist incidents in the United States
Politics of North Carolina
Political violence in the United States
Protest-related deaths
Riots and civil disorder in North Carolina
November 1979 events in the United States
Mass shootings in the United States
Anti-racism in the United States
Anti-fascism in the United States
Ku Klux Klan in North Carolina